The School of Medicine, University of Phayao is a medical school in Mueang Phayao District, Phayao Province.

History 
In 2007, a school of medical sciences was established at the Naresuan University Phayao IT Campus and initially admitted students for the Physical Therapy, Medical Technology and Public Health branches. Following changes in the structure of the university and in preparation for the creation of the new University of Phayao, the planned medical course would be taught in a separate medical school. The branches of Physical Therapy, Medical Technology and Public Health then became part of the School of Allied Health Sciences since 1 October 2008. The School of Medicine was formally set up on 1 December 2008.

Program of Study
 Doctor of Medicine
 Bachelor of Traditional Chinese Medicine
 Bachelor of Applied Thai Traditional Medicine
 Bachelor of Science (Public Health)
 Community Health
 Environmental Health
 Bachelor of Science (Occupational and Safety)
 Bachelor of Science (Health Promotion)
 Bachelor of Science (Emergency Medical Operation)

Teaching Hospitals 

 University of Phayao Hospital
 Nakornping Hospital (CPIRD)
 Phayao Hospital (CPIRD)

See also 

 List of medical schools in Thailand

References 

Article incorporates material from the corresponding article in the Thai Wikipedia.

Medical schools in Thailand
University departments in Thailand